Jingsong station is a subway station on Line 10 of the Beijing Subway. The station handled a peak entry and exit traffic of 109,700 people on May 5, 2013. It was the southeastern terminus of the line until phase two of expansion completed the Line 10 loop.

Station layout 
The station has an underground island platform.

Exits 
There are 4 exits, lettered A, B, C, and D. Exit D is accessible.

Gallery

References

External links

Beijing Subway stations in Chaoyang District
Railway stations in China opened in 2008